Jaganmohini is a 2009 Indian Tamil-language horror film directed by N. K. Viswanathan. It is  based on B. Vittalacharya's cult horror film of the same name which itself was a remake of 1951 Kannada film Jaganmohini. It stars Raja, Namitha and Nila. It was partially reshot into Telugu with the same name (with Ali replacing Vadivelu) and dubbed in Bengali as Mayabini Kanya. The film bombed at the box office. The film was also dubbed in Hindi under the same name.

Plot

The movie begins at Pachai Theevu, ruled by a mighty king (Narasimha Raju). His son and prince Jagathalapradhapan (Raja) is a valorous youth who sets out on a mission to capture pirates in the sea. He lands at Sangu Theevu, where the head of the sea pirates Alai Kallan lives. Jagathalapradhapan comes across Mohini (Namitha) from the local fishing community on the island.
Romance blossoms between them. Jagathalapradhapan manages to capture Alai Kallan and decides to return to his country. He promises Mohini that he would bring his parents to arrange for their wedding. However the King and his wife Mangayarkarasi (Yuvarani) arranges for their son's marriage with a princess Azhagu Nachiyar (Nila). Jagathalapradhapan tries hard to convince his parents that he would marry only Mohini.

To put an end to the problem, the king and his wife hatch a conspiracy and kills Mohini while she is in underwater using thugs. Enters a cruel tantrik (Kota Sreenivasa Rao), who uses the feud between Jagathalapradhapan and Alai Kallan and plans to kill Jagathalapradhapan and thereby get the ultimate power to rule the world. But all his plans are altered when Mohini's spirit comes back to earth. She prevents tantrum to near Jagathalaprathapan. Meanwhile, Mohini wishes to kill Jagathalaprathapan by luring him to have sex with her in an isolated forest so that she can unite with him in heaven, but the plan gets spoiled by Azhagu Nachiyar's smart tricks. Tantrik wants to kill Jagathalaprathapan using Alaikalan so that Goddess will get happy and grant his wish, but instead Jagathalaprathapan kills Alaikalan diverting it. Goddess wants him to ask his wish and she asks for Mohini to get back to her body but it's naturally impossible. Instead she inserts her soul into Azhagu Nachiyar's as alternative so that she gets "motcham" (salvation). They happily rule the kingdom ever after in the end.

Cast
 Raja as Jagathalapradhapan
 Namitha as Jaganmohini
 Vadivelu as Jaganmohan
 Ali (Telugu) as Jaganmohan
 Nila as Azhagu Nachiyar
 Kota Srinivasa Rao as Sidhar
 Riyaz Khan as Indrajith
 Narasimha Raju as the King
 Yuvarani as Mangayarkarasi
 Jyothi Lakshmi as Jaganmohini and Jaganmohan's mother
 Balasingh
 Vennira Aadai Moorthy as Jaganmohan's Assistant
 Shobana as Koda Molakki Kokila
 Madhan Bob as Azhagu Nachiyar's brother
 Alex
 Crane Manohar

Soundtrack
Soundtrack was composed by Ilaiyaraja and lyrics were written by Vaali and Na. Muthukumar.

Reception
Rediff wrote "With its silly storyline and terrible costumes, Jaganmohini is a half-baked remake of the original, with plenty of skin-show and terrible graphics." Behindwoods wrote "The N. K. Vishwanathan directed Jaganmohini is neither spooky nor amusing. Even if you are a die-hard Namitha fan, don’t be surprised if you become incensed towards the end of the movie, for she’s all over it."

References

2009 films
Films shot in Madurai
Films scored by Ilaiyaraaja
2000s Tamil-language films
Indian historical fantasy films
Indian historical horror films
Tamil remakes of Kannada films
Films directed by N. K. Vishwanathan
2009 fantasy films
2009 horror films